Norton Louis Philip Knatchbull, 3rd Earl Mountbatten of Burma (born 8 October 1947), known until 2005 as Lord Romsey and until 2017 as The Lord Brabourne, is a British peer.

Life and education
Lord Mountbatten was born in Lambeth as the eldest son of Patricia Knatchbull, 2nd Countess Mountbatten of Burma, and John Knatchbull, 7th Baron Brabourne.

Mountbatten was educated at the Dragon School, in Oxford, and Gordonstoun School, Elgin, Moray, Scotland. He subsequently attended the University of Kent in southeast England.

He followed his father into the British film industry in the 1970s, working as location manager on A Bridge Too Far and associate producer of Death on the Nile and the television serial Quatermass.

On the death of his father on 23 September 2005, he became the 8th Baron Brabourne, of Brabourne in the County of Kent, in the peerage of the United Kingdom. He also succeeded to the Knatchbull Baronetcy, of Mersham Hatch in the County of Kent, in the baronetage of England. On the death of his mother on 13 June 2017, he became Earl Mountbatten of Burma, also a title in the peerage of the United Kingdom created for his grandfather, Admiral of the Fleet Lord Louis Mountbatten.

He is a descendant of Queen Victoria, whose second daughter Princess Alice of the United Kingdom was his maternal great-great-grandmother.  He is also a second cousin to Charles III, through his mother and Charles' father, Prince Philip, Duke of Edinburgh, who was his godfather. Mountbatten is the godfather of Philip's grandson, the Prince of Wales. He is also related to author Jane Austen, as his father, John Knatchbull, 7th Baron Brabourne, was a direct descendant of her brother Edward Austen Knight.

Marriage and children
Mountbatten is married to Penelope Meredith Eastwood (born 16 April 1953), a daughter of Marian Elizabeth Hood (1926–2020) and Reginald Wray Frank Eastwood (1912–1980), a self-made millionaire who founded the Angus Steakhouse chain. They were wed on 20 October 1979 at Romsey Abbey, Romsey, only two months after the IRA murdered his 79-year-old maternal grandfather, Louis Mountbatten, 1st Earl Mountbatten of Burma; his 14-year-old younger brother, Nicholas Knatchbull; and his 83-year-old paternal grandmother, Doreen Knatchbull, Dowager Lady Brabourne.

The family home is Broadlands, also in Hampshire.

The 3rd Earl Mountbatten of Burma and his wife have three children and three grandchildren:

Nicholas Louis Charles Norton Knatchbull, Lord Brabourne (born 15 May 1981), married on 20 May 2021 to Ambre Pouzet at Broadlands. They have a son, Alexander Knatchbull.
Lady Alexandra Victoria Edwina Diana Knatchbull (born 5 December 1982), a goddaughter of Diana, Princess of Wales, married on 25 June 2016 to Thomas Hooper, CEO of Third Space Learning.  They have two sons.
Leonora Louise Marie Elizabeth Knatchbull (25 June 1986 – 22 October 1991). She died of kidney cancer, and is buried in the grounds of the family home, Broadlands; see Leonora Children's Cancer Fund.

In 2010, Mountbatten started an affair with Lady Nuttall, which lasted until 2014.

Arms

References

Bibliography
 Marlene A. Eilers, Queen Victoria's Descendants (Baltimore, Maryland: Genealogical Publishing Co., 1987), page 184.

External links

1947 births
Living people
People from London
People educated at The Dragon School
People educated at Gordonstoun
Alumni of the University of Kent
English people of German-Jewish descent
Earls Mountbatten of Burma
8
Norton
Norton
Ashley-Cooper family
Eldest sons of British hereditary barons